El Colombiano (The Colombian) is the leading newspaper in Antioquia Department in Colombia whose headquarters are located in Medellín.

The first edition of this newspaper was published on February 6, 1912, which only had one page, 13 advertisements, but no news articles. In 1976, the first color pictures were added and in 1980, the content of this newspaper changed from 8 to 6 columns. On February 16, 2001, it was released with its current layout.

El Colombiano is part of Periódicos Asociados Latinoamericanos (Latin American Newspaper Association), an organization of fourteen leading newspapers in South America.

See also

 El Mundo

External links
 El Colombiano official website
  El Colombiano / English Antioquia section

Newspapers established in 1912
1912 establishments in Colombia